The East Frisian Islands (German: Ostfriesische Inseln, West Frisian: Eastfryske eilannen) are a chain of islands in the North Sea, off the coast of East Frisia in Lower Saxony, Germany. Between the islands and the mainland are extensive mudflats, known locally as Watten, which form part of the Wadden Sea. In front of the islands are Germany's territorial waters, which occupy a much larger area than the islands themselves. The islands, the surrounding mudflats and the territorial waters (The Küstenmeer vor den ostfriesischen Inseln  nature reserve) form a close ecological relationship. The island group makes up about 5% of the Lower Saxony Wadden Sea National Park.

The largest island by surface area is Borkum, located at the western end of the chain; the other six inhabited islands are from west to east: Juist, Norderney with the largest town in the islands, Baltrum, Langeoog, Spiekeroog and Wangerooge. There are also four other small, uninhabited islands: Lütje Hörn east of Borkum, Memmert and Kachelotplate southwest of Juist, Minsener Oog, a dredged island southeast of Wangerooge, and Mellum at the eastern end of the island chain which, following the boundary revision by the Federal Office for Nature Conservation, no longer belongs to the East Frisian Islands, but to the mudflats of the Elbe-Weser Triangle (Watten im Elbe-Weser-Dreieck).

Overview of the islands and sand flats 

The following table contains basic information about the islands and sand flats (Sandplaten). The uninhabited and unparished sand flats are highlighted in yellow.

Norderney is the remaining part of Buise, which was almost entirely engulfed by the sea in the 17th century. Lütje Hörn east of Borkum is in constant danger of being washed away. In 2003 the German Coastal Defence (NLWK) announced that the sandbank Kachelotplate can now be called an island too, because it is no longer regularly flooded by high tide. However, it is not larger than 2 km² and will remain unsettled. Kachelotplate is located north of the mouth of the Ems river.

Most of the islands do not allow cars. The exceptions are Borkum and Norderney, which are also the most crowded islands. There are no bridges connecting the mainland with the islands. Each island is accessible by ferry.

Borkum and Norderney, the Nazi labour camps on Alderney, were named after the islands.

The islands and the surrounding sea are part of the Lower Saxony Wadden Sea National Park.

Effects of storms and currents

Even though today they are established islands, some of them continue to be in motion. On the East Frisian island of Juist for example, since the year 1650 there are five different proven sites for the church, as the spot for rebuilding the church had to keep pace with the ever-moving island. At times, Juist even consisted of two islands, which eventually grew back together. The neighbouring island of Wangerooge in the last 300 years has moved a distance equivalent to its own length to the east, its church tower, destroyed at the outbreak of World War I apparently moving from east to west.

In this process, land is slowly eroded on the western coasts, while sediments are deposited on the eastern coasts. As a result, western coasts are increasingly protected by human action. The canals between the islands serve as passages for the tides, so that in these places the scouring action of current prevents the islands gradually joining one to another.

In popular culture

A German invasion fleet masses in the Frisian Islands in the pre-World War I invasion thriller Riddle of the Sands.

German students memorize the names of the seven inhabited islands by using a mnemonic device:

Welcher Seemann liegt bei Nanni im Bett?

At a first glance, the question for Nanni's company for the night does not seem to make a lot of sense. In the German original, however, the very first letter of every individual word represents the first letter of the name of the island geographically occupying the same position in the chain of islands (in east-to-west-direction) that the respective word occupies within the chain of words, i.e. the sentence.

The device:   Welcher — Seemann — liegt — bei — Nanni — im — Bett?

In English:   Which — seaman — lies — by — Nanni — in [the] — bed? (Here, the word "bei", literally "by", means "next to", "with")

Representing Wangerooge, Spiekeroog, Langeoog, Baltrum, Norderney, Juist '*' and Borkum, in order.

'*' The old German alphabet at the time of the creation of the mnemonic did not yet differ between "i" and "j"

See also

Frisia
West Frisian Islands
Frisian languages
Frisians
East Frisian Low Saxon
List of islands of Germany
List of ferry boats of the East Frisian Islands

References

External links

Basic information on geography and ecology of some of the smaller islands

 
Archipelagoes of Germany
!
Frisian Islands
Landforms of Lower Saxony